The Men's 100 metre butterfly S13 event at the 2016 Paralympic Games took place on 8 September 2016, at the Olympic Aquatics Stadium. Three heats were held. The swimmers with the eight fastest times advanced to the final.

Heats

Heat 1 
11:10 8 September 2016:

Heat 2 
11:13 8 September 2016:

Heat 3 
11:16 8 September 2016:

Final 
19:32 8 September 2016:

See also
 Swimming at the 2020 Summer Paralympics – Men's 100 metre butterfly S13

Notes

Swimming at the 2016 Summer Paralympics